Kacper Chodyna (born 24 May 1999) is a Polish professional footballer who plays as a right-back for Zagłębie Lubin.

Early career
At the age of 10, Chodyna was invited to train with AC Milan youth groups. In 2012, he moved to Lech Poznań.

Club career
On 6 August 2016, Chodyna made his professional debut for Lech Poznań II in a 0–1 away win against Pogoń Szczecin II. On 10 March 2017, he moved to Zagłębie Lubin II with his teammate Serafin Szota.

On 9 February 2020, he made his Ekstraklasa debut in a 2–0 away loss against Piast Gliwice.

Career statistics

References

External links

1999 births
Living people
People from Drawsko Pomorskie
Polish footballers
Association football defenders
Poland youth international footballers
Lech Poznań II players
Lech Poznań players
Bytovia Bytów players
Zagłębie Lubin players
III liga players
I liga players
Ekstraklasa players